Kosadle (Kosare) is a Papuan language of West Papua.

References

Wambaliau, Theresia. 2006. Survey Report on the Kosare Language in Papua, Indonesia. Unpublished manuscript. Jayapura: SIL Indonesia. (in Indonesian)

External links
Kosare. New Guinea World.

Kaure–Kosare languages
Languages of western New Guinea
Language isolates of New Guinea